Sivasubramaniam Kathiravelupillai (24 October 1924 – 31 March 1981) was a Sri Lankan Tamil lawyer, politician and Member of Parliament.

Early life and family
Kathiravelupillai was born on 24 October 1924. He was the son of Sivasubramaniam, a proctor from Irupalai in northern Ceylon. After school he entered the University of Ceylon to study a degree in philosophy. He studied law later.

Career
After qualifying Kathiravelupillai practised civil law.

Kathiravelupillai stood as the Illankai Tamil Arasu Kachchi's (Federal Party) candidate in Jaffna at the March 1960 and July 1960 parliamentary elections but on each occasion was defeated by independent candidate Alfred Duraiappah. He stood as the ITAK candidate in Kopay at the 1965 parliamentary election. He won the election and entered Parliament. Kathiravelupillai played a leading role in the 1961 satyagraha campaign organised by ITAK. He was re-elected at the 1970 parliamentary election.

On 14 May 1972 the ITAK, All Ceylon Tamil Congress, Ceylon Workers' Congress, Eelath Thamilar Otrumai Munnani and All Ceylon Tamil Conference formed the Tamil United Front, later renamed Tamil United Liberation Front (TULF). In 1973 Kathiravelupillai published a pamphlet titled A Statement on Eelam: Co-Existence – Not Confrontation, considered one of the most important documents in the Tamil independence movement, which articulated the reasons why the two nations - Tamils and Sinhalese - needed to co-exist on the island of Ceylon in separate states. Kathiravelupillai was the TULF's candidate in Kopay at the 1977 parliamentary election and was re-elected.

Kathiravelupillai died on 31 March 1981 in Madras, India.

Works
 Glimpses of Western Philosophy
 Rubaiyat of Omar Khayam (1961, translation)
 A Statement on Eelam: Co-Existence – Not Confrontation (1973)

References

1924 births
1981 deaths
Alumni of the University of Ceylon
Illankai Tamil Arasu Kachchi politicians
Members of the 6th Parliament of Ceylon
Members of the 7th Parliament of Ceylon
Members of the 8th Parliament of Sri Lanka
People from Northern Province, Sri Lanka
People from British Ceylon
Sri Lankan Hindus
Sri Lankan Tamil lawyers
Sri Lankan Tamil politicians
Tamil United Liberation Front politicians